Joint Stock Company Inter RAO UES (short form: Inter RAO), traded as, is a  diversified energy holding company headquartered in Moscow, Russia. Its business includes power and heat generation, electricity supply, international energy trading, engineering, design and development of electric power infrastructure. In addition to its assets in Russia it controls several energy companies outside Russia including thermal and hydro power plants, grid operators and energy traders. It holds a monopoly on the export and import of electricity in Russia.

Inter RAO is one of the largest Russian public energy companies by market capitalization which exceeded US$10.5 billion at the end of 2011. In fiscal year 2011 the company reported a revenue of USD 18.24 bn (versus USD 15.28 bn in 2010) and net income of $1.41 billion (vs $614 million in 2010). At the end of 2011, Inter RAO Group had more than 47,000 employees.

History
Inter RAO was established in 1997 as a subsidiary of the Russian unified power company RAO UES. Its initial focus was international energy trading.

In 2002, Inter RAO started exporting electricity from Russia and generating its own electricity. 

In 2005, Inter RAO made several acquisitions:
 50% stake in Ekibastuz GRES-2 Power Station
 25% plus 1 shares North-West Thermal Power Plant
 70% stake in TGR Energy
 51% stake in the Cuciurgan power station

In early 2008, Inter RAO obtainted listings on the Russian stock exchanges MICEX and RTS. As a part of its reorganization, Inter RAO received several Russian power generation facilities including Sochi Thermal Power Plant, North-West Thermal Power Plant, Ivanovo CCPP and Kaliningrad CHPP-2. In the same year, Inter RAO purchased the remaining 49% stake in the Cuciurgan power station.

In following years, the Government of Russia transferred the power companies shares remaining after the reform of RAO UES in the property of state-owned companies RusHydro, FGC UES, Rosimushchestvo, and Rosneftegaz to Inter RAO. That included transfer of 41% stake in Irkutskenergo, 65.8% of OGK-1, 3.24% of OGK-4, 26.43% of OGK-5, 24.9% of TGC-6, 34.21% of TGC-7, 30.54% of TGC-11, 20.24% of Kuzbassenergo, 21.27% of Bashkirenergo, 14.48% of Sangtuda 1 Hydroelectric Power Plant (in Tajikistan), and 100% of Razdan Thermal Power Plant (in Armenia).

In 2009, Inter RAO shares were included in the MSCI EM Index. In the end of 2009, INTER RAO was ranked fifth in Standard & Poor's informational transparency rating of the Russian energy companies. 

In June 2018, board member Karina Tsurkan was arrested by the Federal Security Service, on allegations of spying on behalf of Romania.

On 13 May 2022, Inter RAO subsidiary RAO Nordic announced to suspend deliveries of electricity to Finland and stopped them at midnight. The announcement came one day after Finland's president Sauli Niinistö and prime minister Sanna Marin had expressed their support for Finnish membership in the North Atlantic Treaty Organization (NATO). 
The move fits an ongoing pattern of economic sanctions and counter-sanctions in the wake of the 2022 Russian invasion of Ukraine.

Shareholders
Major shareholders of Inter RAO are Russian state-owned entities. As of August 2018, shareholders of Inter RAO were:
 Rosneftegaz - 27.63%
 FGC UES - 9.24%
 Inter RAO Capital - 29.39%
 Freely traded (minority shareholders) - 33.74%

Boris Kovalchuk is the CEO of Inter RAO.

Operations

Electricity generation

Combined installed capacity of power plants operated by Inter RAO Group is approximately 28 GW. Inter RAO UES controls the following power generation assets.

Russian power generating assets

Power generation assets in other countries

Trading

The main export markets for INTER RAO are Finland, Lithuania and Belarus.

The following Inter RAO subsidiaries are responsible for international energy trading:
 Eastern Energy Company (focused on export of Russian electricity to China)
 RAO Nordic Oy (Finland)
 TGR Enerji (Turkey)
 Inter RAO Lietuva (Lithuania)

From October 2021, Inter RAO has increased supplying electricity to China by 90% up from planned amount, within the terms of the 25-year agreement of 2012 with State Grid Corporation of China. At the end of the same month, China sent out a call to “Inter RAO” for nearly double current amounts of supplies of electricity by the end of the year 2021. According to Alexandra Panina, member of the board of “Inter RAO”, the request of Chinese partners will be ratified almost completely.

In October 2021, Inter RAO announced electricity commercial supplies to Kazakhstan in November, due to its "inhouse" deficiency in this country.

On May 14, 2022 RAO Nordic released a statement saying they were halting the import of power into Finland due to lack of payment. Power transmission halted at 2200 GMT May 14, 2022.

Power supply
Inter RAO Group operates seven Russian power supply companies.

Electric power distribution grids
INTER RAO Group controls two distribution grid companies in South Caucasus, Power Grids of Armenia and Telasi.

Engineering
Inter RAO develops its engineering business as a key component of its integrated business model. In engineering, Inter RAO plans to focus on design of energy infrastructure, coordination of construction, delivery and installation of equipment; installation, configuration and maintenance services; and manufacturing of boiler and turbine equipment. The company asserts that these initiatives of its engineering business will help Inter RAO secure at least 20% of thermal power plant engineering, construction and equipment market.
List of main engineering businesses within Inter RAO Group:

References

External links

Corporate website
INTER RAO on Google Finance

 
Electric power companies of Russia
Conglomerate companies of Russia
Companies based in Moscow
Russian brands
Energy companies established in 1997
1997 establishments in Russia
Companies listed on the Moscow Exchange
Government-owned companies of Russia